Bukovik (meaning 'beech forest') is a South Slavic toponym that may refer to:

Bosnia and Herzegovina
 Bukovik (Breza), village in the municipality of Breza
 Bukovik (Sokolac), village in the municipality of Sokolac
 Bukovik, a mountain ridge in Sarajevo's Ozren

Kosovo
 Bukovik (Gjilan), a village near Pogragjë

North Macedonia
 Bukoviḱ, village near Skoplje
 Bukoviḱ (mountain), south-east of the city of Gostivar, North Macedonia.

Serbia
 Bukovik (Aleksinac), mountain in Eastern Serbia
 Bukovik (Gornji Milanovac), mountain in Central Serbia
 Bukovik (Aranđelovac), village near Aranđelovac
 Bukovik (Prijepolje), village near Prijepolje
 Bukovik (Nova Varoš), village in the municipality of Nova Varoš